Anju Ghosh is a Bangladeshi and Indian (Tollywood) film actress. She is notable for her role in the film Beder Meye Josna (Josna, The Gypsey Daughter) in 1989.

Career
Ghosh debuted in film acting through her role in Soudagor (1982), directed by F. Kabir Chowdhury.

Ghosh acted in around 50 films. Her co-actors included Abdur Razzak, Zafar Iqbal, Wasim and Ilias Kanchan from Bangladesh and Ranjit Mallick, Chiranjeet Chakraborty and Prosenjit Chatterjee from India.

Ghosh left Bangladesh in 1996 and moved to Kolkata, India. In 2018, she started acting for a Bangladeshi film, Madhur Canteen, directed by Saidur Rahman Said.

Ghosh released a music album, Malik Chhara Chithi, in 1990 which included 12 songs.

Citizenship controversy
After joining the Bharatiya Janata Party (BJP) in June 2019, speculation rose about Ghosh's nationality. Later, the BJP claimed that she is a citizen of India and has an Indian passport. West Bengal BJP chief Dilip Ghosh released her birth certificate, issued by the Kolkata Municipal Corporation in 2003. According to the certificate, she was born as Anju Ghosh to Sudhanya Ghosh and Binapani Ghosh on 17 September 1966 in East End Nursing Home, Kolkata. On the other hand, in an interview with Ekushey Television in September 2018, she mentioned about her birth in 1956 in Faridpur District in the-then East Pakistan (now Bangladesh) and her moving to Chittagong before the liberation war of Bangladesh in 1971. She had added about her studies in Krishnakumari High School in Chittagong.

Filmography

References

External links
 

Living people
People from Faridpur District
Bengali actresses
Bengali Hindus
Bangladeshi Hindus
Bangladeshi film actresses
Indian film actresses
Actresses in Bengali cinema
Actresses from Kolkata
Indian expatriate actresses in Bangladesh
Bangladeshi expatriate actresses in India
Bangladeshi emigrants to India
Year of birth missing (living people)
20th-century Bangladeshi actresses
20th-century Indian actresses